John "Jock" Paterson (1926 – 14 January 2000) was a British footballer, who played for Hibernian and Ayr United.

Paterson went three consecutive seasons without missing a league game for Hibs and he played in every game of the championship winning 1951–52 season. Paterson played for the Scottish Football League XI in the following season, in a 3–0 defeat by a Welsh select team. He was unable to play for the Scotland national football team due to his English birthplace.

His son, Craig Paterson, also played for Hibernian. Paterson died in January 2000; a moment's silence was observed in his memory at the next Hibs home match.

References

External links 
Jock Paterson, www.ihibs.co.uk

1926 births
2000 deaths
Sportspeople from Colchester
Association football central defenders
English footballers
Hibernian F.C. players
Ayr United F.C. players
Scottish Football League players
Scottish Football League representative players
Penicuik Athletic F.C. players
Date of birth missing
Anglo-Scots